Sacred Heart School is a Catholic elementary school located in Lombard, Illinois. It was established in 1912, with the first class of 30 students being taught in a barn owned by local resident Martin Hogan. In 1913, the school's first elementary school building was built. The school was originally run by the School Sisters of St. Francis, and had a total enrollment of 66 in 1921.

The school is part of the Roman Catholic Diocese of Joliet in Illinois.

The school holds many activities for students, including an annual runathon and spelling bee.

See also 
 Sacred Heart Church (Lombard, Illinois)

References

External links 
 
 

1912 establishments in Illinois
Catholic elementary schools in Illinois
Educational institutions established in 1912
Lombard, Illinois
Roman Catholic Diocese of Joliet in Illinois
Schools in DuPage County, Illinois